Individualist anarchism in Europe proceeded from the roots laid by William Godwin and soon expanded and diversified through Europe, incorporating influences from individualist anarchism in the United States. Individualist anarchism is a tradition of thought within the anarchist movement that emphasize the individual and his or her will over external determinants such as groups, society, traditions, and ideological systems. While most American individualist anarchists advocate mutualism, a libertarian socialist form of market socialism, or a free-market socialist form of classical economics, European individualist anarchists are pluralists who advocate anarchism without adjectives and synthesis anarchism, ranging from anarcho-communist to mutualist economic types.

Early European individualist anarchism was influenced by many philosophers, including Pierre-Joseph Proudhon, Max Stirner and Henry David Thoreau. Proudhon was an early pioneer of anarchism as well as of the important individualist anarchist current of mutualism. Stirner became a central figure of individualist anarchism through the publication of his seminal work The Ego and Its Own which is considered to be "a founding text in the tradition of individualist anarchism". The philosophy of Max Stirner supports the individual doing exactly what he pleases, taking no notice of God, state, or moral rules. To Stirner, rights were spooks in the mind and held that society does not exist but "the individuals are its reality". Stirner supported property by force of might rather than moral right, advocated self-assertion and foresaw union of egoists drawn together by respect for each other's self-ownership. Thoreau's emphasis on the promotion of simple living, environmental stewardship and civil disobedience were influential in European individualist anarchists. Influential European individualist anarchists include Albert Libertad, Anselme Bellegarrigue, Oscar Wilde, Émile Armand, Lev Chernyi, John Henry Mackay, Han Ryner, Adolf Brand, Miguel Giménez Igualada, Renzo Novatore and Michel Onfray.

An important tendency within European individualist anarchism in general is the emphasis on individual subjective exploration and defiance of social conventions. Individualist anarchist philosophy attracted "amongst artists, intellectuals and the well-read, urban middle classes in general". Murray Bookchin describes a lot of individualist anarchism as people who "expressed their opposition in uniquely personal forms, especially in fiery tracts, outrageous behavior, and aberrant lifestyles in the cultural ghettos of fin de siecle New York, Paris, and London. As a credo, individualist anarchism remained largely a bohemian lifestyle, most conspicuous in its demands for sexual freedom ('free love') and enamored of innovations in art, behavior, and clothing". In this way, free love currents and other radical lifestyles such as naturism had popularity among individualist anarchists. Other important currents common within European individual anarchism include free love, illegalism and freethought.

Early influences

William Godwin 

William Godwin was an individualist anarchist and philosophical anarchist who was influenced by the ideas of the Age of Enlightenment, and developed what many consider the first expression of modern anarchist thought. Godwin was, according to Peter Kropotkin, "the first to formulate the political and economical conceptions of anarchism, even though he did not give that name to the ideas developed in his work." Godwin advocated extreme individualism, proposing that all cooperation in labor be eliminated. Godwin, a utilitarian, believed that not all individuals are of equal value, with some of us "of more worth and importance' than others depending on our utility in bringing about social good. Godwin believed that the person whose life was the most conducive to the general good should be favored, eschewing equal rights. Godwin opposed government because it infringes on the individual's right to "private judgement" to determine which actions most maximize utility, but also objected to all authority over the individual's judgement. This aspect of Godwin's philosophy, minus the utilitarianism, was developed into a more extreme form later by Stirner.

Godwin even opposed individuals performing together in orchestras, writing in Political Justice that "everything understood by the term co-operation is in some sense an evil." The only apparent exception to this opposition to cooperation is the spontaneous association that may arise when a society is threatened by violent force. One reason he opposed cooperation is he believed it to interfere with an individual's ability to be benevolent for the greater good. Godwin opposes the idea of government, but wrote that a minimal state is a present "necessary evil" that would become increasingly irrelevant and powerless by the gradual spread of knowledge. He expressly opposed democracy, fearing oppression of the individual by the majority (though he preferred democracy to dictatorship).

Godwin supported individual ownership of property, defining it as "the empire to which every man is entitled over the produce of his own industry." But he also suggested that individuals give each other their surplus property when the other needed it, without involving trade (e.g. gift economy). Thus, while people have the right to private property, they should give it away as enlightened altruists. Godwin explained this approach stating, "[e]very man has a right to that, the exclusive possession of which being awarded to him, a greater sum of benefit or pleasure will result than could have arisen from its being otherwise appropriated." Yet to Godwin, benevolence was not to be enforced but instead a matter of free individual "private judgement." He did not advocate a community of goods or assert collective ownership as is embraced in communism, but his belief that individuals ought to share with those in need was influential on the later development of anarchist communism.

Godwin's political views were diverse and do not perfectly agree with any of the ideologies that claim his influence; writers of the Socialist Standard, organ of the Socialist Party of Great Britain, consider Godwin both an individualist and a communist; anarcho-capitalist Murray Rothbard did not regard Godwin as an individualist, referring to him as the "founder of communist anarchism"; and historian Albert Weisbord considers him an individualist anarchist without reservation. Some writers see a conflict between Godwin's advocacy of "private judgement" and utilitarianism, as he says that ethics requires that individuals give their surplus property to each other resulting in an egalitarian society, but, at the same time, he insists that all things be left to individual choice. Many of Godwin's views changed over time, as noted by Peter Kropotkin.

Pierre-Joseph Proudhon 

Pierre-Joseph Proudhon was the first philosopher to label himself an "anarchist". Some consider Proudhon to be an individualist anarchist, while others regard him to be a social anarchist. Some commentators reject this, noting his preference for association in large industries, rather than individual control. Nevertheless, he was influential among American individualists; in the 1840s and 1850s, Charles A. Dana, and William B. Greene introduced Proudhon's works to the United States. Greene adapted Proudhon's mutualism to American conditions and introduced it to Benjamin R. Tucker.

Proudhon opposed government privilege that protects capitalist, banking and land interests, and the accumulation or acquisition of property (and any form of coercion that led to it) which he believed hampers competition and concentrates wealth. Proudhon favored the right of individuals to retain the product of their labor as their own property, but believed that all other property was illegitimate. Thus, he saw private property as both essential to liberty and a road to tyranny, the former when it resulted from labor and was required for labor and the latter when it resulted in/from exploitation (profit, interest, rent, tax). He generally termed the former "possession" and the latter "property." For large-scale industry, he supported workers associations to replace wage labor and opposed land ownership.

Proudhon maintained that workers should retain the entirety of what they produce, and that monopolies on credit and land are the forces that prohibit this. He advocated an economic system he called mutualism that included possession and exchange of private property but without profit. Joseph Déjacque explicitly rejected Proudhon's philosophy, instead preferring anarchist-communism, asserting directly to Proudhon in a letter that "it is not the product of his or her labor that the worker has a right to, but to the satisfaction of his or her needs, whatever may be their nature." An individualist rather than anarchist communist, Proudhon said that "communism...is the very denial of society in its foundation..." and famously declared that "property is theft!" in reference to his rejection of ownership rights to land being granted to a person who is not using that land.

After Déjacque and others split from Proudhon, the relationship between individualists, and anarcho-communists was characterized by various degrees of antagonism and harmony. For example, individualists like Tucker at once translated and reprinted the works of collectivists like Mikhail Bakunin while rejecting the economic aspects of collectivism and communism as incompatible with anarchist ideals.

Mutualism 

Mutualism is an anarchist school of thought which can be traced to the writings of Pierre-Joseph Proudhon, who envisioned a society where each person might possess a means of production, either individually or collectively, with trade representing equivalent amounts of labor in the free market. Integral to the scheme was the establishment of a mutual-credit bank which would lend to producers at a minimal interest rate only high enough to cover the costs of administration. Mutualism is based on a labor theory of value which holds that when labour or its product is sold, in exchange it ought to receive goods or services embodying "the amount of labor necessary to produce an article of exactly similar and equal utility". Some mutualists believe that if the state did not intervene, individuals would receive no more income than that in proportion to the amount of labor they exert as a result of increased competition in the marketplace. Mutualists oppose the idea of individuals receiving an income through loans, investments and rent as they believe these individuals are not labouring. Some of them argue that if state intervention ceased, these types of incomes would disappear due to increased competition in capital. Although Proudhon opposed this type of income, he expressed that he "never meant to [...] forbid or suppress, by sovereign decree, ground rent and interest on capital. I believe that all these forms of human activity should remain free and optional for all".

Mutualists argue for conditional titles to land, whose private ownership is legitimate only so long as it remains in use or occupation (which Proudhon called "possession"). Proudhon's mutualism supports labor-owned cooperative firms and associations for "we need not hesitate, for we have no choice [...] it is necessary to form an ASSOCIATION among workers [...] because without that, they would remain related as subordinates and superiors, and there would ensue two [...] castes of masters and wage-workers, which is repugnant to a free and democratic society" and so "it becomes necessary for the workers to form themselves into democratic societies, with equal conditions for all members, on pain of a relapse into feudalism". As for capital goods (man-made and non-land, means of production), mutualist opinion differs on whether these should be common property and commonly managed public assets or private property in the form of worker cooperatives, for as long as they ensure the worker's right to the full product of their labor, mutualists support markets and property in the product of labor, differentiating between capitalist private property (productive property) and personal property (private property).

Following Proudhon, mutualists are libertarian socialists who consider themselves to part of the market socialist tradition and the socialist movement. However, some contemporary mutualists outside the classical anarchist tradition abandoned the labor theory of value and prefer to avoid the term socialist due to its association with state socialism throughout the 20th century. Nonetheless, those contemporary mutualists "still retain some cultural attitudes, for the most part, that set them off from the libertarian right. Most of them view mutualism as an alternative to capitalism, and believe that capitalism as it exists is a statist system with exploitative features". Mutualists have distinguished themselves from state socialism and do not advocate state ownership over the means of production. Benjamin Tucker said of Proudhon that "though opposed to socializing the ownership of capital, Proudhon aimed nevertheless to socialize its effects by making its use beneficial to all instead of a means of impoverishing the many to enrich the few [...] by subjecting capital to the natural law of competition, thus bringing the price of its own use down to cost".

Max Stirner 

Johann Kaspar Schmidt, better known as Max Stirner (the pen name he adopted from a schoolyard nickname he had acquired as a child because of his high brow, Stirn in German), was a German philosopher who ranks as one of the literary fathers of nihilism, existentialism, post-modernism and anarchism, especially of individualist anarchism. Stirner's main work is The Ego and Its Own, also known as The Ego and His Own (Der Einzige und sein Eigentum in German, which translates literally as The Only One and his Property). This work was first published in 1844 in Leipzig, and has since appeared in numerous editions and translations.

Authors, philosophers and artists have cited, quoted or otherwise referred to Stirner. They include Albert Camus in The Rebel (the section on Stirner is omitted from the majority of English editions including Penguin's), Benjamin Tucker, Dora Marsden, Emma Goldman, Georg Brandes, Rudolf Steiner, John Cowper Powys, Émile Armand, Han Ryner, Renzo Novatore, Karl Marx, Robert Anton Wilson, Italian individualist anarchist Frank Brand, Russian-American philosopher Ayn Rand, Bob Black, antiartist Marcel Duchamp, several writers of the Situationist International, and Max Ernst, who titled a 1925 painting L'unique et sa propriété.

The Ego and Its Own has seen periodic revivals of popular, political and academic interest, based around widely divergent translations and interpretations—emphasizing psychological or political views. Today, many ideas associated with post-left anarchy's criticism of ideology and uncompromising individualism are clearly related to Stirner's. Individualist feminism claims him as a pioneer, since his objection to any absolute concept also counts gender roles as "spooks". His ideas were also adopted by post-anarchism, with Saul Newman largely agreeing with many of Stirner's criticisms of classical anarchism, including his rejection of revolution and essentialism.

Egoism 

Stirner's philosophy, sometimes called "egoism", is the most extreme form of IA. He was a Hegelian philosopher whose "name appears with familiar regularity in historically-orientated surveys of anarchist thought as one of the earliest and best-known exponents of IA." Stirner does not recommend that the individual try to eliminate the state but simply exploit it to further the individual's interests. He says that the egoist rejects pursuit of devotion to "a great idea, a good cause, a doctrine, a system, a lofty calling", saying that the egoist has no political calling but rather "lives themselves out" without regard to "how well or ill humanity may fare thereby." Stirner held that the only limitation on the rights of the individual is his power to obtain what he desires. He proposes that most commonly accepted social institutions—including the notion of State, property as a right, natural rights in general, and the very notion of society—were mere spooks in the mind. Stirner wanted to "abolish not only the state but also society as an institution responsible for its members." He advocated self-assertion and foresaw "associations of egoists" where respect for ruthlessness drew people together. Even murder is permissible "if it is right for me."

Stirner claimed that property comes about through might: "Whoever knows how to take, to defend, the thing, to him belongs property." "What I have in my power, that is my own. So long as I assert myself as holder, I am the proprietor of the thing." "I do not step shyly back from your property, but look upon it always as my property, in which I respect nothing. Pray do the like with what you call my property!". His concept of "egoistic property" not only rejects moral restraint on how one obtains and uses things, but includes other people as well. His embrace of egoism is in stark contrast to Godwin's altruism. Stirner was opposed to communism, seeing it as a form of authority over the individual.

In Russia, IA inspired by Stirner combined with an appreciation for Friedrich Nietzsche to attract a small following of bohemian artists and intellectuals such as Lev Chernyi, as well as a few lone wolves who found self-expression in crime and violence. They rejected organizing, believing that only unorganized individuals were safe from coercion and domination. They claimed this belief to be fundamental to anarchism. This type of IA inspired anarcho-feminist Emma Goldman

Though Stirner's philosophy is individualist, it has influenced some libertarian communists and anarcho-communists. "For Ourselves Council for Generalized Self-Management" discusses Stirner and speaks of a "communist egoism", which is said to be a "synthesis of individualism and collectivism", and says that "greed in its fullest sense is the only possible basis of communist society." Forms of libertarian communism such as situationism are influenced by Stirner. Anarcho-communist Emma Goldman was influenced by both Stirner and Peter Kropotkin and blended their philosophies together in her own.

Development by country

France 

Proudhon and Stirner stimulated a strong response in France. An early important example was Anselme Bellegarrigue. He participated in the French Revolution of 1848, was author and editor of Anarchie, Journal de l'Ordre and Au fait ! Au fait ! Interprétation de l'idée démocratique and wrote the important early Anarchist Manifesto in 1850. Catalan historian of individualist anarchism Xavier Diez reports that during his travels in the United States "he at least contacted (Henry David) Thoreau and, probably (Josiah) Warren." Jean-Baptiste Louiche, Charles Schæffer and Georges Deherme edited the individualist anarchist publication Autonomie Individuelle that ran from 1887 to 1888.

Intellectuals such as Albert Libertad, André Lorulot, Émile Armand, Victor Serge, Zo d'Axa and Rirette Maîtrejean extended the theory in France's main individualist anarchist journal, L'Anarchie in 1905 and later in L'En-Dehors. Outside this journal, Han Ryner wrote Petit Manuel individualiste (1903).

French individualist circles displayed a strong sense of personal libertarianism and experimentation. Anarchist naturism and free love concepts influenced individualist anarchists circles in France and Spain and expanded to the rest of anarchism.

Henri Zisly, Émile Gravelle and Georges Butaud promoted anarchist naturism. Butaud was an individualist "partisan of the milieux libres, publishing "Flambeau" ("an enemy of authority") in 1901 in Vienna. He focused on creating and participating in anarchist colonies.

"In this sense, the theoretical positions and the vital experiences of french individualism are deeply iconoclastic and scandalous, even within libertarian circles. The call of nudist naturism, the strong defense of birth control methods, the idea of "unions of egoists" with the sole justification of sexual practices, that will try to put in practice, not without difficulties, will establish a way of thought and action, and will result in sympathy within some, and a strong rejection within others."

Illegalism 

Illegalism developed primarily in France, Italy, Belgium, and Switzerland during the early 20th century as an outgrowth of Stirner's IA. Illegalists typically did not seek moral basis for their actions, recognizing only the reality of "might" rather than "right". They advocated illegal acts to satisfy personal desires, not a larger ideal, although some committed crimes as a form of direct action or propaganda of the deed .

Influenced by Stirner's egoism as well as Proudhon's "property is theft", Clément Duval and Marius Jacob proposed the theory of la individual reclamation.

Illegalism first rose to prominence among a generation of Europeans inspired by the unrest of the 1890s. Ravachol, Émile Henry, Auguste Vaillant, and Caserio committed daring crimes in anarchism's name. France's Bonnot Gang was the most famous group to embrace illegalism.

Albert Libertad 

Joseph Albert, better known as Albert Libertad or Libertad, was an individualist anarchist militant and writer from France who edited the influential anarchist publication L'Anarchie. During the Dreyfus affair, he founded the Anti-Militarist League (1902) "and, along with Paraf-Javal, founded the "Causeries populaires", public discussions that met with great interest throughout the country, contributing to the opening of a bookstore and various clubs in different quarters of Paris". On the occasion of July 14 anniversary, L'Anarchie "printed and distributed the manifesto "The Bastille of Authority" in one hundred thousand copies. Along with feverish activity against the social order, Libertad was usually also organizing feasts, dances and country excursions, in consequence of his vision of anarchism as the "joy of living" and not as militant sacrifice and death instinct, seeking to reconcile the requirements of the individual (in his need for autonomy) with the need to destroy authoritarian society. In fact, Libertad overcame the false dichotomy between individual revolt and social revolution, stressing that the first is simply a moment of the second, certainly not its negation. Revolt can only be born from the specific tension of the individual, which, in expanding itself, can only lead to a project of social liberation. For Libertad, anarchism doesn't consist in living separated from any social context in some cold ivory tower or on some happy communitarian isle, nor in living in submission to social roles, putting off the moment when one puts one's ideas into practice to the bitter end, but in living as anarchists here and now, without any concessions, in the only way possible: by rebelling. And this is why, in this perspective, individual revolt and social revolution no longer exclude each other, but rather complement each other."

Émile Armand 

Émile Armand was an influential French individualist anarchist, free love, polyamory, pacifist and antimilitarist propagandist and activist. He wrote for such anarchist magazines as L'Anarchie and L'En-Dehors. His thought was mainly influenced by such thinkers as Stirner, Benjamin Tucker, and American Transcendentalism. Outside France he was an important influence in Spanish anarchist movements, above all in the individualist publications Iniciales, Al Margen and Nosotros. He defended the Ido constructed language over Esperanto with the help of José Elizalde.

Armand contrasted his IA with social anarchist currents, rejecting revolution. He argued that waiting for revolution meant delaying the enjoyment of liberty until the masses gained awareness and will. Instead he advocated living under one's own conditions in the present time, revolting against social conditioning in daily life and living with those with an affinity to oneself in accord to the values and desire they share. He says the individualist is a "presentist" and "he could not, without bad reasoning and illogic, think of sacrificing his being, or his having, to the coming of a state of things he will not immediately enjoy". He applies this rule to friendship, love, sexual encounters and economic transactions. He adheres to an ethics of reciprocity and advocated propagandizing one's values to enable association with others to improve the chances of self-realization.

Armand advocated free love, naturism and polyamory in what he termed la camaraderie amoureuse. He wrote many propagandist articles on this subject advocating not only a vague free love but also multiple partners, which he called "plural love." "'The camaraderie amoureuse thesis,' he explained, 'entails a free contract of association (that may be annulled without notice, following prior agreement) reached between anarchist individualists of different genders, adhering to the necessary standards of sexual hygiene, with a view toward protecting the other parties to the contract from certain risks of the amorous experience, such as rejection, rupture, exclusivism, possessiveness, unicity, coquetry, whims, indifference, flirtatiousness, disregard for others, and prostitution.'".

Han Ryner 

Han Ryner was a French individualist anarchist philosopher and activist and a novelist.  He wrote for publications such as L'Art social, L'Humanité nouvelle, L'Ennemi du Peuple, L'Idée Libre de Lorulot; and L'En dehors and L'Unique. His thought is mainly influenced by stoicism and epicureanism.

He defines individualism as "the moral doctrine which, relying on no dogma, no tradition, no external determination, appeals only to the individual conscience.". He distinguishes "conquering and aggressive egoists who proclaim themselves to be individualists" from what he called "harmonic individualists" who respected others. He admired Epicurus' temperance and that "he showed that very little was needed to satisfy hunger and thirst, to defend oneself against heat and the cold. And he liberated himself from all other needs, that is, almost all the desires and all the fears that enslave men.". He celebrated how Jesus "lived free and a wanderer, foreign to any social ties. He was the enemy of priests, external cults and, in general, all organizations."

Postwar and contemporary times 
French individualist anarchists grouped behind Émile Armand, published L'Unique after World War II. L'Unique went from 1945 to 1956 with a total of 110 numbers. Gérard de Lacaze-Duthiers (January 26, 1876 – May 3, 1958) was a French writer, art critic, pacifist and anarchist. Lacaze-Duthiers, an art critic for the Symbolist review journal La Plume, was influenced by Oscar Wilde, Nietzsche and Max Stirner. His (1906) L'Ideal Humain de l'Art helped found the 'Artistocracy' movement – a movement advocating life in the service of art. His ideal was an anti-elitist aestheticism: "All men should be artists". Together with André Colomer and Manuel Devaldes, he founded L'Action d'Art, an anarchist literary journal, in 1913. He was a contributor to the Anarchist Encyclopedia. After World War II he contributed to the journal L'Unique.

Within the synthesist anarchist organization, the Fédération Anarchiste, there existed an individualist anarchist tendency alongside anarcho-communist and anarchosyndicalist currents. Individualist anarchists participating inside the Fédération Anarchiste included Charles-Auguste Bontemps, Georges Vincey and André Arru. The new base principles of the Fédération Anarchiste were written by Charles-Auguste Bontemps and the anarcho-communist Maurice Joyeux which established an organization with a plurality of tendencies and autonomy of federated groups organized around synthesist principles. Charles-Auguste Bontemps was a prolific author mainly in the anarchist, freethinking, pacifist and naturist press of the time. His view on anarchism was based around his concept of "Social Individualism" on which he wrote extensively. He defended an anarchist perspective which consisted on "a collectivism of things and an individualism of persons."

In 2002, an anarchist, Libertad organized a new version of L'En-Dehors, collaborating with Green Anarchy and including contributors such as Lawrence Jarach, Patrick Mignard, Thierry Lodé, Ron Sakolsky, and Thomas Slut. Articles about capitalism, human rights, free love and social fights were published. The EnDehors continues now as a website, EnDehors.net.

The prolific contemporary French philosopher Michel Onfray has been writing from an individualist anarchist perspective influenced by Nietzsche, French post-structuralists thinkers such as Michel Foucault and Gilles Deleuze; and Greek classical schools of philosophy such as the Cynics and Cyrenaics. Among the books which best expose Onfray's individualist anarchist perspective include La sculpture de soi : la morale esthétique (The sculpture of oneself: aesthetic morality), La philosophie féroce : exercices anarchistes, La puissance d'exister and Physiologie de Georges Palante, portrait d'un nietzchéen de gauche which focuses on French individualist philosopher Georges Palante.

Italy 
In Italy, individualist anarchism had a strong tendency towards illegalism and violent propaganda by the deed, perhaps more extreme than in France which emphazised criticism of organization be it anarchist or of other type. Acts included notorious magnicides carried out or attempted by individualists Giovanni Passannante, Sante Caserio, Michele Angiolillo, Luigi Lucheni, and Gaetano Bresci who murdered king Umberto I. Caserio lived in France and later assassinated French president Sadi Carnot. The theoretical seeds of current Insurrectionary anarchism were laid out at the end of 19th century Italy combining IA criticism of permanent groups and organization with a socialist class struggle worldview. This thought also motivated Gino Lucetti, Michele Schirru and Angelo Sbardellotto in attempting the assassination of Benito Mussolini. Pietro Bruzzi published the journal L'Individualista in the 1920s alongside Ugo Fedeli and Francesco Ghezzi but who fell to fascist forces later. Pietro Bruzzi also collaborated with the Italian American individualist anarchist publication Eresia of New York City edited by Enrico Arrigoni.

Renzo Novatore 

Renzo Novatore was influenced by Max Stirner, Friedrich Nietzsche, Georges Palante, Oscar Wilde, Henrik Ibsen, Arthur Schopenhauer and Charles Baudelaire. He collaborated in numerous anarchist journals and participated in futurism avant-garde currents.

He proclaimed "revolution is the fire of our will and a need of our solitary minds; it is an obligation of the libertarian aristocracy. To create new ethical values. To create new aesthetic values. To communalize material wealth. To individualize spiritual wealth. Because we violent celebralists and passional sentimentalists at the same time-understand and know that revolution is a necessity of the silent sorrow that suffers at the bottom and a need of the free spirits who suffer in the heights." He summarizes the three options in life as "The stream of slavery, the stream of tyranny, the stream of freedom! With revolution, the last of these streams needs to burst upon the other two and overwhelm them. It needs to create spiritual beauty, teach the poor the shame of their poverty, and the rich the shame of their wealth." These views justified his practice of illegalism and later active resistance to fascism.

Novatore collaborated in the individualist anarchist journal Iconoclasta! alongside the young Stirnerist illegalist Bruno Filippi

Also a poet, Novatore belonged to the leftist section of the avant-garde movement of futurism, alongside others individualist anarchists such as Dante Carnesecchi, Leda Rafanelli, Auro d'Arcola, and Giovanni Governato.

Post-war and contemporary times 
In Italy, individualists anarchists during the Founding Congress of the Italian Anarchist Federation in 1945 were led by Cesare Zaccaria. During the 1965 IX Congress of the Italian Anarchist Federation in Carrara, a splinter group created the Gruppi di Iniziativa Anarchica. In the 1970s, it was mostly composed of "veteran individualist anarchists with an orientation of pacifism, naturism, etc,...".

Egoism had a strong influence on insurrectionary anarchism, as can be seen in the work of Alfredo Bonanno and Michele Fabiani. Bonanno has written on Stirner in works such as Max Stirner and "Max Stirner und der Anarchismus".

In the famous Italian insurrectionary anarchist anonymous essay, "At Daggers Drawn with the Existent, its Defenders and its False Critics" is "The workers who, during a wildcat strike, carried a banner saying, 'We are not asking for anything' understood that the defeat is in the claim itself ('the claim against the enemy is eternal'). There is no alternative but to take everything. As Stirner said: 'No matter how much you give them, they will always ask for more, because what they want is no less than the end of every concession'." Horst Fantazzini (March 4, 1939 Altenkessel, Saarland, West Germany–December 24, 2001, Bologna, Italy), was an Italian-German individualist anarchist who pursued an illegalist lifestyle and practice until his death in 2001. He gained media notoriety mainly due to his many bank robberies through Italy and other countries. In 1999 the film Ormai è fatta! appeared based on his life.

Spain 
Spanish individualist anarchists was influenced by American individualist anarchism but mainly it was connected to the French currents. At the turn of the 20th century people such as Dorado Montero, Ricardo Mella, Federico Urales, Mariano Gallardo and J. Elizalde translated French and American individualists. Important in this respect were also magazines such as La Idea Libre, La Revista Blanca, Etica, Iniciales, Al margen, Estudios and Nosotros. The most influential thinkers there were Stirner, Émile Armand and Han Ryner. Just as in France, Esperanto, anationalism, anarcho-naturism and free love were present. Later Armand and Ryner started publishing in the Spanish individualist press. Armand's concept of amorous camaraderie had an important role in motivating polyamory as realization of the individual.

Recently historian Xavier Diez wrote on the subject in El anarquismo individualista en España: 1923–1938 y Utopia sexual a la premsa anarquista de Catalunya. La revista Ética-Iniciales(1927–1937) deals with free love thought in Iniciales. Diez reports that the Spanish individualist anarchist press was widely read by members of anarcho-communist groups and by members of the anarcho-syndicalist trade union CNT. There were also the cases of prominent individualist anarchists such as Federico Urales and Miguel Giménez Igualada who were members of the CNT and J. Elizalde who was a founding member and first secretary of the Iberian Anarchist Federation.

Federico Urales was an important Catalan individualist anarchist who edited La Revista Blanca. The individualist anarchism of Urales was influenced by Auguste Comte and Charles Darwin. He saw science and reason as a defense against blind servitude to authority. He was critical of influential individualist thinkers such as Nietzsche and Stirner for promoting an asocial egoist individualism and instead promoted an individualism with solidarity as a way to guarantee social equality and harmony. In the subject of organization, he was highly critical of anarcho-syndicalism as he saw it plagued by too much bureaucracy and thought that it tended towards reformism. He favored small groups based on ideological alignment. He supported the establishment of the Iberian Anarchist Federation in 1927 and participated in it.

In 2000, the Ateneo Libertario Ricardo Mella, Ateneo libertario Al Margen, Ateneu Enciclopèdic Popular, Ateneo Libertario de Sant Boi, Ateneu Llibertari Poble Sec y Fundació D'Estudis Llibertaris i Anarcosindicalistes republished Émile Armand's writings on free love and individualist anarchism in a compilation titled Individualist anarchism and Amorous camaraderie.

Miguel Giménez Igualada 

An important Spanish individualist anarchist was Miguel Giménez Igualada, who wrote the lengthy theory book called Anarchism espousing his individualist anarchism. Between October 1937 and February 1938 he starts as editor of the individualist anarchist magazine Nosotros, in which many works of Han Ryner and Émile Armand appear and will also participate in the publishing of another individualist anarchist maganize Al Margen: Publicación quincenal individualista. In his youth he engaged in illegalist activities. His thought was deeply influenced by Max Stirner, of which he was the main popularizer in Spain through his writings. He publishes and writes the preface to the fourth edition in Spanish of The Ego and Its Own from 1900. He will propose the creation of a union of egoists, which will be a Federation of Individualist Anarchists in Spain, but did not succeed. In 1956 publishes an extensive treatise on Stirner which he dedicates to fellow individualist anarchist Émile Armand Afterwards he will travel and live in Argentina, Uruguay and Mexico.

In his major work Anarchism Igualada states that "humanism or anarchism,...for me are the same thing". He sees the anarchist as one who "does not accept the imposition of a thought on us and who does not allows one's own thought to be imposed over another brain, oppressing it...since anarchy is not for me a mere negation, but a twofold activity of consciousness; in the first instance a consciousness of the individual on its meaning within the human world, defending his personality against every external imposition; on a second instance, and here is present the whole great beauty of its ethic, it defends, stimulates and enhances the other's personality.... Igualada exposes a radical pacifist view when he thinks that "When I say that through war humanity will never find peace, I sustain my affirmation in the fact that those who are more peaceful are the least believers, and so...one can affirm that the day of happiness in which war (religiosity is bellicosity) is extirpated from consciousness, peace will exists in the home of men, and since from consciousness these beliefs will not be extracted but only through an act of transcendental education, our labor is not of killing, but of education having it well present that to educate is not in any case domestication.

Freethought 

Freethought as a philosophical position and as activism was important in European individualist anarchism. "Anticlericalism, just as in the rest of the libertarian movement, in another of the frequent elements which will gain relevance related to the measure in which the (French) Republic begins to have conflicts with the church...Anti-clerical discourse, frequently called for by the French individualist André Lorulot, will have its impacts in Estudios (a Spanish individualist anarchist publication). There will be an attack on institutionalized religion for the responsibility that it had in the past on negative developments, for its irrationality which makes it a counterpoint of philosophical and scientific progress. There will be a criticism of proselitism and ideological manipulation which happens on both believers and agnostics.". This tendencies will continue in French individualist anarchism in the work and activism of Charles-Auguste Bontemps and others. In the Spanish individualist anarchist magazine Ética and Iniciales "there is a strong interest in publishing scientific news, usually linked to a certain atheist and anti-theist obsession, philosophy which will also work for pointing out the incompatibility between science and religion, faith and reason. In this way there will be a lot of talk on Darwin's theories or on the negation of the existence of the soul.".

Anarcho-naturism 

Another important current, especially within French and Spanish individualist anarchist groups was naturism. Naturism promoted an ecological worldview, small ecovillages, and most prominently nudism as a way to avoid the artificiality of the industrial mass society of modernity. Naturist individualist anarchists saw the individual in his biological, physical and psychological aspects and avoided, and tried to eliminate, social determinations. An early influence in this vein was Henry David Thoreau and his famous book Walden Important promoters of this were Henri Zisly and Émile Gravelle who collaborated in La Nouvelle Humanité followed by Le Naturien, Le Sauvage, L'Ordre Naturel, & La Vie Naturelle.

This relationship between anarchism and naturism was quite important at the end of the 1920s in Spain. "The linking role played by the 'Sol y Vida' group was very important. The goal of this group was to take trips and enjoy the open air. The Naturist athenaeum, 'Ecléctico', in Barcelona, was the base from which the activities of the group were launched. First Etica and then Iniciales, which began in 1929, were the publications of the group, which lasted until the Spanish Civil War. We must be aware that the naturist ideas expressed in them matched the desires that the libertarian youth had of breaking up with the conventions of the bourgeoisie of the time. That is what a young worker explained in a letter to 'Iniciales' He writes it under the odd pseudonym of 'silvestre del campo', (wild man in the country). "I find great pleasure in being naked in the woods, bathed in light and air, two natural elements we cannot do without. By shunning the humble garment of an exploited person, (garments which, in my opinion, are the result of all the laws devised to make our lives bitter), we feel there no others left but just the natural laws. Clothes mean slavery for some and tyranny for others. Only the naked man who rebels against all norms, stands for anarchism, devoid of the prejudices of outfit imposed by our money-oriented society."". "The relation between Anarchism and Naturism gives way to the Naturist Federation, in July 1928, and to the lV Spanish Naturist Congress, in September 1929, both supported by the Libertarian Movement. However, in the short term, the Naturist and Libertarian movements grew apart in their conceptions of everyday life. The Naturist movement felt closer to the Libertarian individualism of some French theoreticians such as Henri Ner than to the revolutionary goals proposed by some Anarchist organisations such as the FAI, (Federación Anarquista Ibérica)".

Germany

Individualist anarchism and Friedrich Nietzsche 

The thought of German philosopher Friedrich Nietzsche has been influential in individualist anarchism specifically in thinkers such as the French Émile Armand, the Italian Renzo Novatore, the Russian Lev Chernyi, the Colombian Biofilo Panclasta, and also "translations of Nietzsche's writings in the United States very likely appeared first in Liberty, the anarchist journal edited by Benjamin Tucker."

John Henry Mackay 

In Germany, the Scottish-born German John Henry Mackay became the most important individualist anarchist propagandist. He fused Stirnerist egoism with the positions of Benjamin Tucker and translated Tucker into German. Two semi-fictional writings of his own Die Anarchisten and Der Freiheitsucher contributed to individualist theory, updating egoist themes with respect to the anarchist movement. His writing were translated into English as well. Mackay is also an important European early activist for LGBT rights.

Adolf Brand 

Adolf Brand was a German writer, Stirnerist anarchist and pioneering campaigner for the acceptance of male bisexuality and homosexuality. Brand published the world's first ongoing homosexual publication, Der Eigene in 1896. The name was taken from Stirner, who had greatly influenced the young Brand, and refers to Stirner's concept of "self-ownership" of the individual. Der Eigene concentrated on cultural and scholarly material, and may have averaged around 1500 subscribers per issue during its lifetime. Contributors included Erich Mühsam, Kurt Hiller, John Henry Mackay (under the pseudonym Sagitta) and artists Wilhelm von Gloeden, Fidus and Sascha Schneider. Brand contributed many poems and articles himself. Benjamin Tucker followed this journal from the United States.

Anselm Ruest and Salomo Friedlaender 

Der Einzige was the title of a German individualist anarchist magazine. It appeared in 1919, as a weekly, then sporadically until 1925 and was edited by cousins Anselm Ruest (pseud. for Ernst Samuel) and Mynona (pseud. for Salomo Friedlaender). Its title was adopted from the book Der Einzige und sein Eigentum (engl. trans. The Ego and Its Own) by Max Stirner. Another influence was the thought of German philosopher Friedrich Nietzsche. The publication was connected to the local expressionist artistic current and the transition from it towards dada.

Russia 
Individualist anarchism was one of the three categories of anarchism in Russia, along with the more prominent anarchist communism and anarcho-syndicalism. The ranks of the Russian individualist anarchists were predominantly drawn from the intelligentsia and the working class. For anarchist historian Paul Avrich "The two leading exponents of individualist anarchism, both based in Moscow, were Aleksei Alekseevich Borovoi and Lev Chernyi (Pavel Dmitrievich Turchaninov). From Nietzsche, they inherited the desire for a complete overturn of all values accepted by bourgeois societypolitical, moral, and cultural. Furthermore, strongly influenced by Max Stirner and Benjamin Tucker, the German and American theorists of individualist anarchism, they demanded the total liberation of the human personality from the fetters of organized society."

Some Russian individualists anarchists "found the ultimate expression of their social alienation in violence and crime, others attached themselves to avant-garde literary and artistic circles, but the majority remained "philosophical" anarchists who conducted animated parlor discussions and elaborated their individualist theories in ponderous journals and books."

Lev Chernyi 

Lev Chernyi was an important individualist anarchist involved in resistance against the rise to power of the Bolchevik Party. He adhered mainly to Stirner and the ideas of Benjamin Tucker. In 1907, he published a book entitled Associational Anarchism, in which he advocated the "free association of independent individuals.". On his return from Siberia in 1917 he enjoyed great popularity among Moscow workers as a lecturer. Chernyi was also Secretary of the Moscow Federation of Anarchist Groups, which was formed in March 1917. He was an advocate "for the seizure of private homes", which was an activity seen by the anarchists after the October revolution as direct expropriation on the bourgoise. He died after being accused of participation in an episode in which this group bombed the headquarters of the Moscow Committee of the Communist Party. Although most likely not being really involved in the bombing, he might have died of torture.

Chernyi advocated a Nietzschean overthrow of the values of bourgeois Russian society, and rejected the voluntary communes of anarcho-communist Peter Kropotkin as a threat to the freedom of the individual. Scholars including Avrich and Allan Antliff have interpreted this vision of society to have been greatly influenced by the individualist anarchists Max Stirner, and Benjamin Tucker. Subsequent to the book's publication, Chernyi was imprisoned in Siberia under the Russian Czarist regime for his revolutionary activities.

Alexei Borovoi 

Alexei Borovoi was a professor of philosophy at Moscow University, "a gifted orator and the author of numerous books, pamphlets, and articles which attempted to reconcile individualist anarchism with the doctrines of syndicallism". He wrote among other theoretical works, Anarkhizm in 1918 just after the October revolution and Anarchism and Law.  For him "the chief importance is given not to Anarchism as the aim but to Anarchy as the continuous quest for the aim". He manifests there that "No social ideal, from the point of view of anarchism, could be referred to as absolute in a sense that supposes it's the crown of human wisdom, the end of social and ethical quest of man."

United Kingdom and Ireland 
The English Enlightenment political theorist William Godwin was an important influence early influence as mentioned before.

In the late 19th century individualist anarchists such as Wordsworth Donisthorpe, Joseph Hiam Levy, Joseph Greevz Fisher, John Badcock, Jr., Albert Tarn, and Henry Seymour were close to Tucker's magazine Liberty. In the mid-1880s Seymour published a journal called The Anarchist. and also later took a special interest in free love as he participated in the journal The Adult: A Journal for the Advancement of Freedom in Sexual Relationships. "The Serpent, issued from London...the most prominent English-language egoist journal, was published from 1898 to 1900 with the subtitle 'A Journal of Egoistic Philosophy and Sociology'".

Philosopher and writer Herbert Read wrote on Godwin and works such as To Hell With Culture, The Paradox of Anarchism Philosophy of Anarchism, Anarchy & Order; Poetry & Anarchism and My Anarchism. Henry Meulen was notable for his support of free banking. Sidney Parker is a British egoist who wrote articles and edited anarchist journals from 1963 to 1993 such as Minus One, Egoist, and Ego.

Donald Rooum is an English anarchist cartoonist and writer with a long association with Freedom Press. Rooum stated that for his thought "The most influential source is Max Stirner. I am happy to be called a Stirnerite anarchist, provided 'Stirnerite' means one who agrees with Stirner's general drift, not one who agrees with Stirner's every word." An Anarchist FAQ reports that "From meeting anarchists in Glasgow during the Second World War, long-time anarchist activist and artist Donald Rooum likewise combined Stirner and anarcho-communism."

In the hybrid of post-structuralism and anarchism called post-anarchism the British Saul Newman has written a lot on Stirner and his similarities to post-structuralism. He writes:
Max Stirner's impact on contemporary political theory is often neglected. However in Stirner's political thinking there can be found a surprising convergence with poststructuralist theory, particularly with regard to the function of power. Andrew Koch, for instance, sees Stirner as a thinker who transcends the Hegelian tradition he is usually placed in, arguing that his work is a precursor poststructuralist ideas about the foundations of knowledge and truth.

Newman has published several essays on Stirner. "War on the State: Stirner and Deleuze's Anarchism" and "Empiricism, pluralism, and politics in Deleuze and Stirner" discusses what he sees are similarities between Stirner's thought and that of Gilles Deleuze. In "Spectres of Stirner: a Contemporary Critique of Ideology" he discusses the conception of ideology in Stirner. In "Stirner and Foucault: Toward a Post-Kantian Freedom" he identifies similarities between Stirner and Michel Foucault. Also he wrote "Politics of the ego: Stirner's critique of liberalism".

Oscar Wilde 

Oscar Wilde, the Irish anarchist writer of the decadent movement, influenced individualist anarchists such as Renzo Novatore and gained the admiration of Benjamin Tucker. In his important essay The Soul of Man Under Socialism from 1891 he defended socialism as the way to guarantee individualism and so he saw that "With the abolition of private property, then, we shall have true, beautiful, healthy Individualism.  Nobody will waste his life in accumulating things, and the symbols for things.  One will live.  To live is the rarest thing in the world.  Most people exist, that is all." For anarchist historian George Woodcock "Wilde's aim in The Soul of Man under Socialism is to seek the society most favorable to the artist...for Wilde art is the supreme end, containing within itself enlightenment and regeneration, to which all else in society must be subordinated...Wilde represents the anarchist as aesthete." Woodocock finds that "The most ambitious contribution to literary anarchism during the 1890s was undoubtedly Oscar Wilde The Soul of Man under Socialism" and finds that it is influenced mainly by the thought of William Godwin.

See also 
 Individualist anarchism in France
 Individualist anarchism in the United States

References

Bibliography 
 Diez, Xavier El anarquismo individualista en España (1923–1939). Virus Editorial, 2007.
 Parry, Richard. The Bonnot Gang: The Story Of The French Illegalists . Rebel Press, 1987.
 Sonn, Richard D. Sex, Violence, and the Avant-Garde: Anarchism in Interwar France. Penn State Press. 2010.
 Parvulescu, Constantin. The individualist anarchist journal "Der Einzige" and the making of the radical Left in the early post-World War I Germany.
 An enquiry concerning political justice and its influence on morals and happiness by William Godwin
 What is Property? by Pierre Joseph Proudhon
 General Idea of the Revolution in the Nineteenth Century (1851)  by Pierre Joseph Proudhon
 The Ego and his own by Max Stirner
 "Anarchist Individualism as a Life and Activity" by Émile Armand
 Mini-Manual of Individualism by Han Ryner
 Voluntary non-submission. Spanish individualist anarchism during dictatorship and the second republic (1923–1938) by Xavier Diez PDF in Spanish
 THE "ILLEGALISTS" by Doug Imrie
 Toward the creative Nothing by Renzo Novatore
 "Han Ryner or the Social Thinking of an Individualist in the Early Part of the 20th Century" by Gérard Lecha in French
 Émile Armand, Petit manuel anarchiste individualiste
 Social Anarchism or Lifestyle Anarchism – An Unbridgeable Chasm by Murray Bookchin
 "A Sure Means to Pluck Joy Immediately: Destroy Passionately" by Zo d'Axa
 "Down With the Law!" by Albert Libertad
 "Why I Was a Burglar" by Marius Jacob
 "Who Are We? What Do We want?" (1911) by André Lorulot
 "Anarchism and Individualism" by Georges Palante
 Anarchist of Love: The Secret Life of John Henry Mackay by Hubert Kennedy
 "The English Individualists As They Appear In Liberty" by Carl Watner

External links 
 L'En Dehors current French individualist anarchist magazine and website which reclaims the inheritance of Zo d'Axa's and Émile Armand's L'En-Dehors
 Han Ryner blog
 Han Ryner archive
  NovAtore.it Sito dedicato alla memoria di Renzo Novatore mostly in Italian with a small section in English and includes many of Novatore's works translated into English
 Émile Armand archive
 "E. Armand and "la camaraderie amoureuse" Revolutionary sexualism and the struggle against jealousy" by Francis Ronsin
 The Anarchism of Émile Armand biography and some articles by Armand
 Zo d'Axa archive
 Albert Libertad archive
 Andre Lorulot Reference Archive
 The rebel's dark laughter: the writings of Bruno Filippi

Anarchism in Europe
Individualism
Individualist anarchism